The Palms Shopping Centre is a shopping mall located in the suburb of Shirley, Christchurch. Situated  from the city's CBD.

Description

The mall consists of 95 retailers, including Countdown, Farmers and the first Reading Cinemas multiplex in Christchurch. In 2003, a $50 million NZD upgrade was completed, nearly doubling the size to 35,343 m2 (380,429 ft²) . The entry plaza of the mall won an NZILA Silver award for landscape design in 2004.

Australian based AMP Capital had owned The Palms since 2007, when it bought the mall from Christchurch businessmen and Hallenstein Glassons directors Tim Glasson and Warren Bell. The mall was originally developed in the 1990s by Christchurch brothers Max and Glen Percasky, who own the Homebase shopping centre north of The Palms.

DiMauro Group, an Australian investor purchased The Palms for $88.8 million in 2022.

References

Shopping centres in New Zealand
Buildings and structures in Christchurch
2011 Christchurch earthquake
1990s architecture in New Zealand